Fernando Casado Arambillet (La Coruña (Spain), 20 September 1917 – Madrid (Spain), 9 March 1994), best known as Fernando Rey, was a Spanish film, theatre, and television actor, who worked in both Europe and the United States. A suave, international actor best known for his roles in the films of surrealist director Luis Buñuel (Viridiana, 1961; Tristana, 1970; Discreet Charm of the Bourgeoisie, 1972; That Obscure Object of Desire, 1977) and as the drug lord Alain Charnier in The French Connection (1971) and French Connection II (1975), he appeared in more than 150 films over half a century.

The debonair Rey was described by French Connection producer Philip D'Antoni as "the last of the Continental guys". He achieved his greatest fame after he turned 50: "Perhaps it is a pity that my success came so late in life", he told the Los Angeles Times. "It might have been better to have been successful while young, like El Cordobés in the bullring. Then your life is all before you to enjoy it."

Biography

The beginnings
Rey was born in A Coruña, Spain, the son of Captain Casado Veiga and Sara Arambillet Rey.  He studied architecture, but the Spanish Civil War interrupted his university studies which led him to his success.

In 1936, Rey began his career in films as an extra, sometimes even getting credited. It was then that he chose his stage name, Fernando Rey. He kept his first name, but took his mother's second surname, Rey, a short surname with a clear meaning ("Rey" is Spanish for "King").

In 1944, his first speaking role was the Duke of Alba in José López Rubio's Eugenia de Montijo. Four years later, he acted the part of Felipe I el Hermoso, King of Spain, in the Spanish cinema blockbuster Locura de amor.

This was the start of a prolific career in film (he played in around two hundred films), radio, theatre, and television. Rey was also a great dubbing actor in Spanish television. His voice was considered intense and personal, and he became the narrator of important Spanish movies including Luis García Berlanga's Bienvenido Mr. Marshall (1953), Ladislao Vajda's Marcelino Pan y Vino (1955), and even the 1992 re-dubbed version of Orson Welles' Don Quixote. In fact, Rey acted in four different film versions of Don Quixote in different roles, if one counts the Welles version (for which Rey supplied offscreen narration in the final scene).

His brilliant performance in the role of a demotivated and doubtful actor in Juan Antonio Bardem's Cómicos (1954), while showing him for the first time in a successful lead part, paradoxically, as he saw himself as the real incarnation of the role, plunged him in a professional depression, of which he did not emerge until his collaboration with Luis Buñuel several years later. However, in the short term, Buñuel's disconcerting public remark on Rey's performance in another of Bardem's film, Sonatas (1959), "I love how this actor plays a corpse", could only increase Rey's apprehensions. Nevertheless, eventually Rey became Buñuel's preferred actor and closest friend.

International career
Rey's first international performance was in The Night Heaven Fell (Les bijoutiers du clair de lune) a 1958 French-Italian film directed by Roger Vadim, where he acted alongside Stephen Boyd, Marina Vlady and Brigitte Bardot. Previously he had played in an American TV series, It happens in Spain, the story of the exploits of a private detective, operating out in Spain, who helps distressed American tourists.

In 1959, Rey co-starred with Steve Reeves and Christine Kaufmann in the Italian sword and sandal film The Last Days of Pompeii.

In 1961 Rey played in a European Western, The Savage Guns, and as the popularity of that genre increased during that decade appeared in some other movies, including the political The Price of Power (1969), the cult classic Compañeros, and two sequels of The Magnificent Seven, namely Return of the Seven (1966) and Guns of the Magnificent Seven (1969).

It was his work with Orson Welles and Luis Buñuel during the 1960s and 1970s that made Rey internationally prominent; becoming the first 'international Spanish actor.' Rey starred in Buñuel's Viridiana (1961), Tristana (1970), The Discreet Charm of the Bourgeoisie (Le charme discret de la bourgeoisie) (1972) (a surreal movie which received the 1972 Academy Award for Best Foreign Language Film) and That Obscure Object of Desire (1977). For Welles, Rey performed in two completed films, Chimes at Midnight (1966) and The Immortal Story (1968).

Rey played memorably the French villain Alain Charnier in William Friedkin's The French Connection (1971).  Initially, Friedkin intended to cast Francisco Rabal as Charnier, but could not remember his name after seeing him in Luis Buñuel's Belle de jour; he only knew the person he had in mind was a Spanish actor who had worked with Buñuel. Rey was hired after he flew to New York to be met by a surprised Friedkin.  Rey's English and French were not perfect, but Friedkin discovered that Rabal spoke neither of them, and opted to keep Rey, who reprised the role in the less successful sequel, French Connection II (1975).

Along 1970s and 1980s Rey played in many international co-productions, some of his appearances being cameos.  These films include Lewis Gilbert's The Adventurers (1970), Mauro Bolognini's Drama of the Rich (1974), Vincente Minnelli's A Matter of Time (1976), Valerio Zurlini's The Desert of the Tartars (1976), Robert Altman's Quintet (1979), J. Lee Thompson's Caboblanco (1980) and Frank Perry's Monsignor (1982).  One of Rey's greater successes in these years was Elisa, vida mía, a 1977 Spanish drama film written and directed by Carlos Saura.

On his work in Stuart Rosenberg's Voyage of the Damned (1976), Rey once said: "I played [Cuban] president Brú; a cameo.  They paid me a lot of money for less than six hours of shooting, in the Barcelona Stock Exchange building, with James Mason.  I got more money than Orson Welles, who played a great role ...".

Back in Spain
In later years, Rey preferred to work in Spain, with successes as Francisco Regueiro's Padre Nuestro (1985), José Luis Cuerda's El bosque animado (1987) and Jaime de Armiñán's Al otro lado del túnel (1992) as well as his portrayal of Don Quixote, alongside Alfredo Landa as Sancho Panza, in the memorable Manuel Gutiérrez Aragón's El Quijote de Miguel de Cervantes (1991) for the Spanish National TV.

His last appearance on the screen was in a supporting role in the Spanish black comedy El cianuro ... ¿sólo o con leche? (Cyanide ... pure or with milk?) (1994).

Recognition and awards
In 1971 Fernando Rey won the best actor award in the San Sebastián International Film Festival, for his performance in Rafael Gil's La duda, based, like Viridiana and Tristana, on a novel by Benito Pérez Galdós.

Another of the successes of Rey-Buñuel's collaboration was That Obscure Object of Desire (1977), nominated for another Academy Award for Best Foreign Language Film. It was also nominated for a Golden Globe in the same category, though the movie failed to win either. Rey's voice had to be dubbed by Michel Piccoli.

In Lina Wertmüller's Academy Award-nominated film, Seven Beauties (1975), Rey played the role of Pedro the anarchist who, as a friend of the protagonist and fellow prisoner Pasqualino Settebellezze, chooses a gruesome suicide, rather than spend another day in a Nazi concentration camp.

Rey won Best Actor award at 1977 Cannes Film Festival for his performance in Elisa, vida mía.

In 1988 he again won the best actor award in the San Sebastián International Film Festival, this time for his performance in two films:  Francisco Regueiro's Diario de invierno and Antonio Isasi-Isasmendi's El Aire de un Crimen (The Hint of a Crime).

Fernando Rey was also awarded the gold medal of the Spanish Movie Arts and Sciences Academy.

Personal life and death
In 1960, Rey married the Argentine actress Mabel Karr. They had a son, Fernando Casado Campolongo.

In 1992 he became chairman of the Academia de las Artes y las Ciencias Cinematográficas de España succeeding Antonio Giménez-Rico. He died of bladder cancer in Madrid on 9 March 1994.

He was survived by his wife, who died on 1 May 2001 at Hospital Ramon Cajal from a generalized infection. On 25 September 2018 their son Fernando Casado confirmed she died from a sharp mediastinitis during the filming of a tv series named El Secreto.

Selected filmography

See also

 Cinema of Spain

References

Bibliography

External links
 

1917 births
1994 deaths
20th-century Spanish male actors
Best Actor Goya Award winners
Cannes Film Festival Award for Best Actor winners
Deaths from bladder cancer
Deaths from cancer in Spain
Expatriate male actors in the United States
Male Spaghetti Western actors
Male actors from Galicia (Spain)
People from A Coruña
Spanish male film actors
Spanish expatriates in the United States